Hu Na (born April 16, 1963) is a former professional tennis player best known for defecting from the People's Republic of China to the United States in 1982, thereby sparking a Cold War-era diplomatic incident. Diplomatic relations between the two countries had been established in 1979, and the Hu Na incident was among the first major tests of those newly established relations.

Early life
Hu Na was a young and rising tennis star from China's Sichuan province. She had a talent for sports from a very early age, and spent several hours practicing every day.  Noting her talent, her father was able to enroll her in a special athletic school.  She took a special interest in tennis, going on to win first at the Sichuan provincial-level competition, then the national-level young tennis tournament, making her China's top-ranked tennis player.  At this point, she was invited to join the China national women's tennis team, based in Beijing.

Diplomatic incident

Beginning of incident

In July 1982, while touring California for 1982 Federation Cup with the China Federation Cup team, on her second day in America, Hu Na fled her hotel room and sought refuge in the home of friends. In April 1983, she requested political asylum, stating that she had a "well-founded" fear of persecution because of repeatedly refusing to join the Communist Party of China.

Immediate reactions of American and Chinese governments
The US government allowed her to remain in America while it considered her request. It delayed nearly eight months in making a decision. On the one hand, Hu Na had considerable sympathy from President Reagan's administration and from the American public, but on the other hand, American diplomats knew that to grant Hu Na asylum would almost certainly damage relations with China and possibly drive it closer to the Soviet Union.

The Chinese government suggested that the 19-year-old star was too young to have made such a decision independently, and pointed out that her lawyer was being paid for by donations from Taiwan. It promised not to punish her if she returned home, and implied that separating Hu from her family by keeping her in the United States would be cruel.

Granting of asylum

The US Department of State finally issued a memo supporting her asylum claim to the Department of Justice, which had the ultimate responsibility to make a decision. On April 5, 1983, the United States formally granted Hu Na political asylum.

The Chinese government was infuriated, saying that this constituted blatant American intervention in its domestic affairs. They then announced they would sever all cultural and artistic ties between the two countries.  A Voice of America radio broadcasting delegation visit to China, scheduled to take place just a few days later, was cancelled.  American diplomats in Beijing found themselves cut off from invitations and contacts with the Chinese government.

Long-term effects

Hu Na's defection was a clear win for American foreign policy. Although Hu Na herself was likely of little concern to the Chinese,  the incident was an embarrassment for the Chinese government and brought to light other bilateral points of contention. One contemporary article stated that the Chinese, through diplomatic channels, suggested that they would not have complained as much if Hu Na had been granted some type of immigration status other than "political asylum".

Later life

After receiving asylum. Hu Na played professional tennis for the United States. Her best Grand Slam result was a third-round finish at the 1985 Wimbledon. She retired from professional play in 1991, however, after sustaining injuries.

Hu Na resettled in Taiwan, where she worked as a tennis commentator for ESPN and established the Hu Na Bitan Tennis Club in Taipei which later trained the Taiwanese tennis star Hsieh Su-wei. She has returned to mainland China many times to promote the sport and visit her family.

In 2011, Hu Na had a dream which she interpreted as a sign to start painting. Ever since then she has established herself as a professional painter. She has produced over 400 paintings in 6 years. In November 2012, she showcased her artwork in her first oil painting world tour. In 2017, Hu Na held the "Hu Na Lotus Sutra Oil Painting  Collection World Tour".

WTA Tour finals

Doubles (1–2)

See also
Tennis in China

References

External links
 
 
 

1963 births
Living people
1983 in China
American female tennis players
American emigrants to Taiwan
American sportswomen of Chinese descent
Chinese defectors
Chinese emigrants to the United States
Defectors to the United States
Sportspeople from Chengdu
Taiwanese female tennis players
Tennis commentators
Taiwanese-American tennis players
Taiwanese people from Sichuan
Tennis players from Sichuan